is a railway station in the city of Kosai, Shizuoka Prefecture, Japan, operated by Central Japan Railway Company (JR Tōkai).

Lines
Washizu Station is served by the Tōkaidō Main Line, and is located 276.6 kilometers from the southern terminus of the line at Tokyo Station. This is approximately at the half-way point on the Tōkaidō Main Line between Tokyo Station and Nagoya Station.

Station layout
The station has a side platform serving Track 1, and an island platform serving Track 2 and Track 3. The platforms are connected by a footbridge. The station building has automated ticket machines, TOICA automated turnstiles and a staffed ticket office.

Platforms

Adjacent stations

|-
!colspan=5|Central Japan Railway Company

Station history
On September 1, 1888 the section of the Tōkaidō Main Line connecting Hamamatsu Station with Ōbu Station was completed, and a rail siding was established at the site of present-day Washizu Station. As the area was completely rural at the time, stops were discontinued from August 1892; however, due to the strong petition by the surrounding villages, a station was established on January 10, 1915 for both passenger service and freight. Freight service was discontinued on April 26, 1971.

Station numbering was introduced to the section of the Tōkaidō Line operated JR Central in March 2018; Washizu Station was assigned station number CA39.

Passenger statistics
In fiscal 2017, the station was used by an average of 3480 passengers daily.

Surrounding area
Lake Hamana
 Kosai City Hall

See also
 List of Railway Stations in Japan

References
Yoshikawa, Fumio. Tokaido-sen 130-nen no ayumi. Grand-Prix Publishing (2002) .

External links

Official home page

Railway stations in Japan opened in 1915
Railway stations in Shizuoka Prefecture
Tōkaidō Main Line
Stations of Central Japan Railway Company
Kosai, Shizuoka